The white-backed fire-eye has been split into 3 species:

 East Amazonian fire-eye, Pyriglena leuconota
 Tapajos fire-eye, Pyriglena similis
 Western fire-eye, Pyriglena maura

Birds by common name